Douglas Webster St Aubyn Berneville-Claye (26 November 1917 – 1975), born Douglas Berneville Claye, was a British Nazi collaborator and member of the SS British Free Corps during the Second World War.

Early life
Douglas Berneville-Claye was born in Plumstead, London in November 1917, the son of a Staff Sergeant in the Royal Army Service Corps. His father's family, the Clays, Websters, and Wainwrights, were industrial working-class from Leeds, Yorkshire, and his father, Frederick Wainwright Claye, was awarded an MBE in 1919 for his services in France.

He was educated in the local schools and in 1932 enrolled at the Army Technical School at Chepstow. He left the Army Technical School and went home to his parents' pub at Little Ouseburn, a village on the old Roman road between Ripon and York. His father had retired from the army after long service. In 1934 he joined the Lancers at York, which is probably where he learned to ride.  He was still only 17 when he left the army to work as an instructor at a riding school near Thames Ditton and married there for the first time. That marriage lasted a matter of weeks but resulted in a daughter. In 1936, he abandoned his wife to move to Leeds, where he worked as a freelance journalist for the local press.

Second World War
On the outbreak of the Second World War Claye volunteered for the Royal Air Force and was accepted as an aircrew trainee, but he did not pass his final exams. In April 1940 he went AWOL to enter into a bigamous marriage with his current girlfriend. A son was born of the first bigamous marriage. Following this, he found a job in an aircraft factory and joined the Home Guard.

Claye borrowed his father's old uniform and began wearing it in public, with a set of RAF pilot's wings attached. While doing so he was involved in a traffic accident, and after hospital treatment was sent to a convalescent home for officers. While there, he stole another officer's cheque book and after a police investigation was discovered to have obtained the sum of £5 10s by deception. He appeared before magistrates and was additionally fined £7 for impersonating an officer. Although he was remanded for trial, the charges were eventually dropped because he had repaid the money he had stolen and agreed to be bound over for two years.

Active service
It was at this time that Claye started calling himself the Honourable Douglas St Aubyn Webster Berneville-Claye and enlisted as a private soldier in the West Yorkshire Regiment. He did not stay in the ranks for long. At enlistment, he claimed to have been educated at Charterhouse School, Magdalen College, Oxford, and Emmanuel College, Cambridge, and as a result was selected for officer training. The officer training was carried out at Pwllheli and Sandhurst, where he was granted his commission as a second lieutenant in October 1941. He spent six months with the 11th Battalion of the West Yorkshire Regiment, then in June 1942 was posted to Egypt.

Berneville was one of his given names, along with Webster (his grandmother's maiden name) but it is not known why he chose to use 'St Aubyn'. His surname at birth was Clay.

In the next few months he was again charged with cheque fraud and court-martialled, but he carried out his own legal representation (claiming to be a barrister) and managed to be acquitted. He then supposedly inherited his father's title and became "Lord Charlesworth" and volunteered for L detachment of the Special Air Service, reportedly in a quartermaster role.

His father had had a successful army career, working his way up through the ranks from the early years of the 20th century to his retirement in the early 1930s as a senior NCO and the award of an MBE, but there was no title that could have been inherited.

Capture by the enemy
In December 1942, he took part in a penetration operation in Tunisia and was captured by the Afrika Korps. He was sent from North Africa to Italy where he was interrogated, and then sent to an Italian Prisoner of War camp in northern Italy, from which he later claimed to have made repeated escapes. After the Italian Armistice in September 1943, Claye and his POWs were evacuated to Germany where he ended up in Oflag 79 at Waggum, near Brunswick.

Collaboration
During 1944, the prisoners in Oflag 79 began to suspect that one of their number was an informer, and they eventually decided that it was Berneville-Claye. In December 1944, after Oflag 79 had been moved to Fallingbostel, the Senior British Officer informed the camp's German Commandant that the prisoners planned to court-martial and execute an informer and Claye was transferred by the Germans for his own safety.

Claye's subsequent movements are unclear. He was reportedly sighted by POWs in Fallingbostel and Hanover dressed in civilian clothing but then disappeared from view until early March 1945 when he was appointed to the staff of the III (Germanic) SS Panzer Corps at Templin, dressed as an SS Hauptsturmführer. He was invited to dine with the III Corps commander, Obergruppenführer Felix Steiner, where he explained that although he was a captain in the Coldstream Guards and a member of the British peerage, "Lord Charlesworth", he was a firm anti-communist and had volunteered to fight to preserve Europe from the communist threat. Apparently, he was so convincing that Steiner took him at face value.

At that time, the remains of the British Free Corps were in the same area, and Steiner decided to appoint Claye to take charge of them. On 19 April 1945 he arrived at the Corps' base in Templin 'dressed in a black SS tank uniform bearing the insignia of Hauptsturmführer in the British Free Corps.' Claye told the Corps members 'that he was the son of an earl, a captain in the Coldstream Guards and was going to collect two armoured cars and lead them against the Russians. He also guaranteed that the BFC men would be in no trouble with the British authorities, telling them that Britain would be at war with the Russians within a few days.'. When the Corps members refused to follow him, Claye took Alexander MacKinnon, one of the Free Corps soldiers, as a driver, and headed west in a stolen vehicle. He discarded his German uniform and surrendered to a British airborne unit somewhere west of Schwerin.

Claye managed to evade any repercussions for his collaboration with the Germans; the former inmates of Oflag 79 had no concrete evidence that Claye had been the informer they had sought, and no evidence could be found that Claye had actually volunteered for the Waffen-SS. Claye's story was that he had escaped from Oflag 79 by his own efforts and had acquired a uniform from a German woman with whom he had hid. Evidence from British Free Corps soldiers was deemed too tainted to use in court.

Postwar
Claye was sent back to Britain a free man and given the acting rank of captain. He next became the adjutant of a POW camp in Yorkshire. He was court-martialled again for wearing the ribbon of the Distinguished Service Order, which he claimed he had been awarded, and as a result was demoted to second lieutenant and lost his seniority. He was also court-martialled for having an "improper relationship" with an ATS driver (a son was born of that relationship, adopted) and was finally court-martialled for the theft of army property for which he was cashiered and imprisoned. Around this time he decided to remarry, when his bigamy also came to light. A son was born of the second bigamous marriage.

After his release from prison Claye dropped out of sight. He appeared as a witness for the defence in a murder trial in 1950, then in the late 1950s surfaced near Hemel Hempstead, where he secured a managerial position with Rank Xerox. Claye played the role of an ex-Guards officer, riding to hounds, chairing village committees, and wearing his decorations at Remembrance Day parades. This ended when he abandoned his family and ran off with the wife of one of his colleagues (a son, adopted, was born of that escapade). He soon returned to his wife, after which the family emigrated to Australia. Four children were born of that second marriage.

In Australia, Claye worked for a time as a radio announcer before becoming a schoolteacher at St Gregory's College in Campbelltown, New South Wales. He died of cancer in Australia in 1975. Until 2008, the school had a "Douglas Berneville-Claye Memorial Trophy" awarded for debating and public speaking.

In popular culture
Many readers' first acquaintance with the British Free Corps came in Jack Higgins's Second World War thriller The Eagle Has Landed. A character appears named Harvey Preston, who is described as a British soldier who became an officer in the BFC after being caught informing on his fellow POWs. Like Douglas Berneville-Claye, Preston is a gifted impersonator of the English nobility, but is in reality a man of humble origins and a petty criminal. Despite his reluctance, Preston is coercively attached in 1943 to an Abwehr mission in which a Fallschirmjäger unit parachutes into the fictional Norfolk seaside village of Studley-Constable and attempts to kidnap Winston Churchill. An extremely brutal and cowardly man, Preston is also a true believer in Nazism and is accordingly viewed with disgust by every member of the German unit.

Notes

References

 Ronald Seth. Jackals of the Reich. The Story of the British Free Corps. (New English Library, 1972) – Chapter 15 – 'One Archibald Webster'. This book was effectively a re-writing by the British spy writer Ronald Seth of The Yeomen of Valhalla (Behind the Siegfried Line). Seth also chose to use the same pseudonyms. Neither of these books included references or a bibliography and, as a result, some subsequent writers have taken the pseudonyms to be real names.
British Security Service files on him are held by The National Archives under references KV 2/626 and KV 2/627.

External links 
BBC article on Douglas Berneville-Claye

1917 births
1975 deaths
Military personnel from London
West Yorkshire Regiment soldiers
British anti-communists
British Army personnel of World War II
British Army personnel who were court-martialled
British Home Guard soldiers
Deaths from cancer in New South Wales
English emigrants to Australia
English members of the British Free Corps
Graduates of the Royal Military College, Sandhurst
People from Plumstead
Special Air Service officers
West Yorkshire Regiment officers
World War II prisoners of war held by Germany
World War II prisoners of war held by Italy
Royal Air Force personnel of World War II
Prisoners and detainees of the British military